Thomas Wilson's "The Pitman’s Pay" was first printed in a Newcastle magazine called "Mitchell's Magazine" in 1826. Further sections were printed in 1828 and 1830.

It was later republished by George Watson, a Gateshead printer.

A further book, A collection of selected songs by Gateshead composer Thomas Wilson, which included The Pitman’s Pay, was reprinted 14 years after his death in 1872.

Much of the work is written in Geordie dialect. For translations, see Geordie dialect words.

Notes

References 

 Full text of poem at Wikisource

External links 
 Pitman’s Pay
 North East Archives
 Durham and Tyneside dialect group

English folk songs
Songs related to Newcastle upon Tyne
1826 songs
Northumbrian folklore